Beit Iba is a Palestinian village in the Nablus Governorate in the North central West Bank, located 7 kilometers northwest of Nablus. According to the Palestinian Central Bureau of Statistics (PCBS), the village had a population of 3,268 inhabitants in mid-year 2006.

Location
It is bordered by Nablus  and Beit Wazan to the east, An-Naqura and Zawata to the north, Deir Sharaf and Qusin to the west, and Sarra and Beit Wazan to the south.

History
Ceramics from the Byzantine era have been found here.

Ottoman era
In 1517, the village was incorporated into the Ottoman Empire with the rest of Palestine, and in 1596, Beit Iba appeared in Ottoman tax registers as being in  nahiya (subdistrict) of Jabal Qubal under the liwa' (district) of Nablus.  It had a population of 20 households, all Muslims. They paid a fixed tax rate of 33,3% on wheat, barley, summer crops, olive trees,   goats and/or beehives, in addition to occasional revenues and a tax on people in the Nablus district; a total of 9,000 akçe. Half to the revenue went to a Waqf.

In 1838,  in the Biblical Researches in Palestine, Beit Iba  was located in the District of Jurat 'Amra, south of Nablus.

In 1882, the PEF's Survey of Western Palestine described Beit Iba as:  "A village of moderate size in low ground, with olives; it is of mud and stone, with a good spring ('Aines Subian); to the north. The olive groves in the valley are very fine and ancient; here and there is a small mill, and in spring a stream of water.

British Mandate era
In the  1922 census of Palestine conducted by the British Mandate authorities, Beit Iba had a population of 456; all Muslims, increasing slightly  in the 1931 census to 470 Muslims, in a total of 121 houses.

In  the 1945 statistics, the population was 630, all Muslims, with 5,063 dunams of land, according to an official land and population survey. Of this, 762 dunams were for plantations or irrigated land, 3,368 for cereals, while 41 dunams were built-up land.

Jordanian era
In the wake of the 1948 Arab–Israeli War Beit Iba came  under Jordanian rule.

The Jordanian census of 1961 found 1,069 inhabitants in Beit Iba.

1967 and aftermath
Since  the Six-Day War in 1967, Beit Iba has been under Israeli occupation. 

After the 1995 accords, 45% of the village land is defined as being in Area A, 34% is  Area B, while the remaining 21% Area C.

References

Bibliography

External links
  Welcome To Bayt Iba
Survey of Western Palestine, Map 11:   IAA, Wikimedia commons
Beit Iba Village profile, Applied Research Institute–Jerusalem, ARIJ
Beit Iba, aerial photo, ARIJ
Development Priorities and Needs in Beit Iba, ARIJ

Nablus Governorate
Villages in the West Bank
Municipalities of the State of Palestine